Lieutenant-General Sir Sadul Singh GCSI, GCIE, KStJ, CVO (7 September 1902 – 25 September 1950) was the last reigning Maharaja of Bikaner from 2 February 1943 to 30 March 1949, continuing as Head of the House of Bikaner and holding the title of Maharaja of Bikaner until his death.

Biography 
The eldest surviving son of General Sir Ganga Singh, Sir Sadul Singh had, for the thirty years leading up to his succession, been serving in many important posts for his father. He had been a Page of Honour at the coronation of King George V and had attended him at the durbar in Delhi. In 1919, Sir Sadul was present at the Paris Peace Conference and attended the 1924 meeting of the League of Nations. He served as Chief Minister of Bikaner from 1920 to 1925 and fought in the Second World War in Persia, the Middle East and Burma. As the time for Indian independence drew near, Sir Sadul was among the first princes to accede to the Dominion of India, which he did on 7 August 1947. On 30 March 1949, Sir Sadul merged Bikaner into the United State of Greater Rajasthan.

Family

Marriage 
He married in April 1922 Maharani Sudarshan Prasad Kanwarji Sahiba, daughter of Maharaja Venkatraman Ramanuj Prasad Singh Ju Deo of Rewa.

Children

Death 
He died in London on 25 September 1950 at the age of 48. His eldest son, Karni Singh succeeded him as the Maharaja of Bikaner.

References

Maharajas of Bikaner
Knights Grand Commander of the Order of the Star of India
Knights Grand Commander of the Order of the Indian Empire
Indian Commanders of the Royal Victorian Order
Knights of the Order of St John
1902 births
1950 deaths
Indian knights
Indian Army personnel of World War II
Administrators in the princely states of India